Pseudocercospora kaki is a fungal plant pathogen, who causes leaf spot of persimmon. Some examples of host species are Diospyros hispida, Diospyros kaki, Diospyros lotus, Diospyros texana, and Diospyros tupru.

References

Fungal tree pathogens and diseases
Fruit tree diseases
kaki